The Norwegian ambassador to the United States is the official representative of the Government of Norway to the Government of the United States.

List of Norwegian Representatives

References 

 
Norway
United States